The women's individual compound competition at the 2022 European Archery Championships took place from 6 to 11 June in Munich, Germany.

Qualification round
Results after 72 arrows.

Final round

Elimination round

Section 1

Section 2

Section 3

Section 4

Source:

References

Women's Individual Compound
2022 in women's archery